Buddhism amongst the Tamils was historically found in the Tamilakam region of India and Northern Sri Lanka.

India

Origin
The heritage of the town of Nākappaṭṭinam is found in the Burmese historical text of the 3rd century BCE and gives evidence of a Budha Vihar built by the King Ashoka. An inscription from Anuradhapura, Sri Lanka dated to 2nd century BCE records the association of Tamil merchants with Buddhist institution.

For several centuries in the second millennium of the common era Buddhism among the Tamils in Tamil Nadu and Sri Lanka was neglected and virtually abandoned due to shifts in political patronage and the revivalism among non-Buddhist religions. According to A.J.V. Chandrakanthan who recently (2019) published an article about an 11th-century comparative work named Veerasoliyam, codifying Tamil and Sanskrit Philology and Poetics is a clear indicator of the prominence given to Buddhism in Tamil scholarship.  However the pan Saiva revival in Tamilagam in the second half of the second millennium and the Vaishnava resurgence coupled with the Bhakti movement ushered in a new era of religious militancy that virtually eradicated Buddhism forever from the Tamil-speaking regions of the South of India.

Ancient ruins of a 4th-5th-century Buddhist monastery, a Buddha statue, and a Buddhapada (footprint of the Buddha) were found in another section of the ancient city, now at Pallavanesvaram.

Nāgappaṭṭinam was a Buddhist centre of the 4th-5th century CE. Its stupa dates from this era. Buddhism disappeared from this city as of an unknown date but was revived as of the 9th century. (H.P.Ray, The Winds of Change, Delhi 1994, p. 142) In the 11th century, Chudamani Vihara was built by the Javanese king Sri Vijaya Soolamanivarman with the patronage of Raja Raja Chola I. The "Animangalam Copperplate" of Kulothungachola notes that “Kasiba Thera” [Buddhist Monk] renovated the Buddhist temple in the 6th century with the help of Buddhist monks of "Naga Nadu". This "nagar annam vihar" later came to be known as "Nagananavigar".  Buddhism flourished until the 15th century and the buildings of the vigara survived until the 18th century.
Kanchipuram is one of the oldest cities in South India, and was a city of learning for Tamil, Sanskrit, and Pali and was believed to be visited by Xuanzang. He visited the city in the 7th century and said that this city was 6 miles in circumference and that its people were famous for bravery and piety as well as for their love of justice and veneration for learning. He further recorded that Gautama Buddha had visited the place. It was during the reign of the Pallava dynasty from the 4th to the 9th centuries that Kanchipuram attained its limelight. The city served as the Pallava capital, and many of the known temples were built during their reign. According to Tamil tradition, the founder of Zen, Bodhidharma was born here.

In the 8th century CE, Buddhist monk Vajrabodhi, the son of a Tamil aristocrat, travelled from Tamil Nadu to the Tang capital of Chang'an, via Sri Lanka and Srivijaya, after mastering the art of Tantric Buddhism. He took a plethora of new theological beliefs to a China that was largely following Confucianism or Daoism. Vajrabodhi's contribution to the growth of Tantric Buddhism in China has been recorded by one of his lay disciples, Lü Xiang.

Thalaivetti Muniappan Buddhist Temple 
The Madras High Court was hearing a plea by the Buddha Trust in Salem, which said that the idol was originally that of the Buddha, but over time it was taken over and was worshipped as that of Thalaivetti Munniappan. The Madras High Court has declared that the statue of the main deity at a temple in Salem district is that of Buddha and not a Hindu deity. The idol in the temple is currently being worshipped as Thalaivetti Muniappan. The High Court was hearing a plea by Buddha Trust, based in Salem, who had filed a petition in 2017 saying that the idol is of the Buddha. Taking cognisance of a report filed by the state archaeological department that a preliminary inspection has revealed that the statue of the Buddha, Justice N Anand Venkatesh has ruled that the idol is indeed originally that of the Bhuddha.

Sri Lanka

Jaffna peninsula

Nāga Tivu/ Nāga Natu was the name of the whole Jaffna Peninsula in some historical documents. There are number of Buddhist myths associated with the interactions of people of this historical place with Buddha. This Nagadeepa Purana Viharaya was located close to the ancient Nainativu Nagapooshani Amman Temple of Nainativu, one of the Shakti Peethas. The word Naga was sometimes written in early inscriptions as Nāya, as in Nāganika - this occurs in the Nanaghat inscription of 150 BCE.

The famous Vallipuram Buddha statue built with Dravidian sculptural traditions from the Amaravati school was found in excavations below the Hindu temple. The language of the inscription is Tamil language-Prakrit, which shares several similarities with script inscriptions used in Andhra at the time, when the Telugu Satavahana dynasty was at the height of its power and its 17th monarch Hāla (20-24 CE) married a princess from the island. Peter Schalk writes, "Vallipuram has very rich archaeological remains that point at an early settlement. It was probably an emporium in the first centuries AD. […] From already dated stones with which we compare this Vallipuram statue, we can conclude that it falls in the period 3-4 century AD. During that period, the typical Amaravati-Buddha sculpture was developed." The Buddha statue found here was given to King of Thailand by the then British Governor Henry Blake in 1906.

Indrapala argued for a flourishing pre-Christian Buddhist civilization in Jaffna, in agreement with Paranavithana, and Mudliyar C. Rasanayakam, Ancient Jaffna in an earlier work, 1965.

This place is similar to Nagapatnam where all Asian vessels used it as a stopover point and the Buddhist and Hindu Dagobas are just a resting and worshipping places for the sailors and international traders. .

A group of Dagobas situated close together at the Kadurugoda Vihara site in Kandarodai served as a monastery for Tamil monks and reflect the rise in popularity of Mahayana Buddhism amongst Jaffna Tamils and the Tamils of the ancient Tamil country in the first few centuries of the common era before the revivalism of Hinduism amongst the population.

Trincomalee
Thiriyai is referred to as Thalakori in the 2nd century CE map of Ptolemy.  Pre-Christian-Buddhist Tamil-Brahmi inscriptions have been found in the area, the oldest belonging to the 2nd century BCE. Thiriyai formed a prominent village of Jaffna's Vannimai districts in the medieval period. The site is home to Mahayana Buddhist vatadage ruins worshipped by the locals during the rise of Tamil Buddhism in the area. During Paramesvaravarman I's reign, the famous Tiriyai Pallava Grantha inscriptions of 7th-8th century Tamilakam were recorded in the village. The inscription refers to Tamil merchant mariners from Tamil Nadu, their seafaring and commerce to Trincomalee. It details their endowment of this shrine dedicated to the Buddhist deity Avalokitesvara and his consort Tara. Dvarapala sculptures found at the ruins are early contributions of the Pallava school of art to the island.

The Chola Dynasty patronized several religions amongst Tamils, including Saivism, Vaishnavism, and Buddhism. They built Buddhist temples known as "Perrumpallis". In the eleventh century the Velgam Vehera of Periyakulam was renovated and renamed by the Cholas as Rajarajaperumpalli after they conquered the Anuradhapura and established their rule in Polonnaruwa. Tamil inscriptions excavated from this site point to the attention the Cholas paid to the development of Trincomalee District as a strong Saiva Tamil principality and for their contributions to the upkeep of several shrines including the monumental Shiva Koneswaram temple of Trincomalee.

Literature
Various scholarly works dating back to the 5th, 6th and 7th century of the common era saw the birth of classical Tamil works composed by eminent Tamil poets with Buddhist philosophical themes and insights illustrate the impact that Buddhism had in the world of Tamil scholarship. One of the classical products of that period is the ancient Tamil Buddhist epic-poem Manimekalai by the celebrated poet Chithalai Chathanar is set in the town of Kaveripattanam.

Tamil Buddhist historical figures

Bodhidharma - founder of Chan Buddhism, believed to have come from Kanchipuram
Bodhisena - Buddhist scholar notable for travelling to Japan
Buddhadatta - 5th-century Theravada Buddhist writer 
Dhammapāla - Theravada Buddhist commentator believed to have lived at Badara Tittha Vihara
Dignāga - 6th-century Buddhist scholar and one of the founders of the Buddhist school of logic
Vajrabodhi - Esoteric Buddhist monk and one of the 8 patriarchs of Shingon Buddhism. Also associated with the Nalanda monastery in Bihar

See also
 Buddhaghosa
 Dhammapāla
 Manimekalai
 Kundalakesi
 Sri Lanka Maha Bodhi Centre, Chennai

Notes

References

Sources

External links
 THE VALLIPURAM BUDDHA IMAGE
 Thalaivetti Muniappan turns Buddha

 
Tamil history
History of Tamil Nadu
History of Southeast Asia
History of South Asia
Cultural history of India
History of Kerala
History of Andhra Pradesh
Sri Lankan Tamil history
History of Karnataka
Ancient Tamil Nadu
Kingdoms
Buddhist communities of Sri Lanka